Takanini is an electorate to the New Zealand House of Representatives. It is located in South Auckland and was first created for the 2020 New Zealand general election. Neru Leavasa is the sitting Member of Parliament.

Population centres
The electorate is located in the far south of Auckland, on the edge of the city's built-up area. It stretches from Wattle Downs in its southwest to Mission Heights in the north. It was created out of eastern parts of the  electorate around Goodwood Heights and Greenmeadows, a small part of northeastern  around Mission Heights, and a northern section of the  electorate around Takanini and Wattle Downs. This was due to rapid population growth in the area caused mainly by the outward expansion of Auckland.

Electorate profile
South Auckland has traditionally been a stronghold for the Labour Party. Takanini, however, was considered to be a marginal seat between Labour and National, as it takes in both Labour-leaning areas and National-leaning areas. Initially, the electorate's name was proposed as Flat Bush after the Auckland suburb in the north of the electorate. After a public consultation period, the name was changed to Takanini after a suburb in the south of the electorate.

Members of Parliament

List MPs
As of  no candidates who have contested the Takanini electorate have been returned as list MPs.

Election results

2020 election

References

2020 establishments in New Zealand
New Zealand electorates in the Auckland Region